Àlex Corretja was the defending champion but lost in the second round to David Sánchez.

Jiří Novák won in the final 5–7, 6–3, 6–3, 1–6, 6–3 against Roger Federer.

This tournament was also notable for being the first ATP tournament in which future Grand Slam Champion Stanislas Wawrinka competed in the main draw. He drew Jean-René Lisnard in the first round and was defeated.

Seeds
A champion seed is indicated in bold while text in italics indicates the round in which that seed was eliminated.

  Roger Federer (final)
  Rainer Schüttler (quarterfinals)
  Jiří Novák (champion)
  Gastón Gaudio (semifinals)
  Juan Ignacio Chela (quarterfinals)
  Nikolay Davydenko (first round)
  Àlex Corretja (second round)
  Radek Štěpánek (semifinals)

Draw

 NB: The Final was the best of 5 sets while all other rounds were the best of 3 sets.

Final

Section 1

Section 2

References
 2003 Allianz Suisse Open Gstaad Draw

Swiss Open (tennis)
2003 ATP Tour
2003 Allianz Suisse Open Gstaad